Theodosia was built at Shields in 1782. She spent 20 years trading with the Baltic, and then another dozen trading with North America and the Baltic. From 1816 she traded with India, sailing under a license from the British East India Company. She was wrecked while returning from a voyage to India in 1825.

Career
Theodosia first appeared in Lloyd's Register (LR) in 1784 with J.Culingham, master, James Aram, owner, and trade Onega-Hull. Thereafter she traded with the Baltic and Flanders for some two decades. 

In 1813 the EIC had lost its monopoly on the trade between India and Britain. British ships were then free to sail to India or the Indian Ocean under a license from the EIC.

On 2 February 1816 Theodosia, E. Wardropper, master and J.Gladstone, owner, sailed for Fort William, India under a license from the EIC.

On 10 May 1819 Theodosia, Morrison, master, had to put back into Bengal. She was on her way to the Mediterranean but three days out of Coringa she had become leaky.

On 16 March 1822 Theodosia, Kidson, master, was off Liverpool. She had left Bengal on 6 September 1821, Madras on 21 October, and the Cape of Good Hope on about 1 January 1819.

Fate
Theodosia, Kidson, master, from Bengal to London, put back to Saugor on 9 June 1825 being leaky.

Theodosia was wrecked on 14 August 1825 at Pondy on the Coromandel Coast. Her crew were rescued. She was on a voyage from Bengal, India to London.

Citations and references
Citations

References
 

1782 ships
Age of Sail merchant ships of England
Maritime incidents in August 1825